"Sanctuary" is the debut single by Australian recording artist Gabriella Cilmi from her debut album, Lessons to Be Learned (2008). The song was first released digitally in the United Kingdom on 12 December 2007 as the album's lead single, and subsequently released in Germany and the Netherlands in December 2008 as its fifth single, reaching number sixty-seven on the German Singles Chart and number seventy-two on the physical sales-based Dutch Single Top 100 chart.

"Sanctuary" utilises the introductory riff of Maxine Brown's 1964 version of "Oh No Not My Baby". Regarding the song's meaning, Cilmi explained, "I met someone who I felt really comfortable with and all those feelings that come with feeling comfortable with someone. The song is kind of about that, although I'm not even friends with that person any more."

Music video
Directed by Michael Baldwin and produced by Charlotte Woodhead, the music video opens with Cilmi in a house where she turns on a reel-to-reel tape player. She then leans on a table followed by her in a garden, then in her bed, then it shows clips of the different places she is, then it shows her in a street twirling her umbrella, then it shows clips of her in these different places, while she is in the house she decides to chuck her scarf on the floor, it shows her in the different places again when several things start to float, in the house her scarf starts to float, upstairs in her bedroom her pen floats so she can write in a book, she sits down on a chair in the house, the telephone starts floating, then she kicks a bunch of leaves, then it shows more clips, then in the house when Cilmi points at something it turns off. It finishes with her closing the door.

Track listings
UK iTunes single
"Sanctuary" – 3:28
"Sanctuary" (acoustic version) – 3:30

German CD single
"Sanctuary" (radio edit) – 3:00
"Sanctuary" (Pocketknife's Full Length Re-Edit) – 5:32

German CD maxi single
"Sanctuary" (radio edit) – 3:00
"Sanctuary" (Pocketknife's Full Length Re-Edit) – 5:32
"Sanctuary" (Solitaire Club Mix) – 5:30
"Sanctuary" (video) – 3:02

UK promo remix CD single
"Sanctuary" (Mac Project Club Mix) – 8:00
"Sanctuary" (Solitaire Club Remix) – 5:28
"Sanctuary" (Alex B Club Mix) – 7:57
"Sanctuary" (Alex B Dub Mix) – 8:02
"Sanctuary" (Alex B Radio Edit) – 3:43
"Sanctuary" (Solitaire Radio Edit) – 3:22
"Sanctuary" (Mac Project Radio Edit) – 3:33

Personnel
Credits adapted from the liner notes of Lessons to Be Learned.

 Gabriella Cilmi – vocals
 Nick Coler – bass, guitar, keyboards, programming
 Richard Edgeler – mixing assistant
 Brian Higgins – keyboards, production, programming
 Tim Powell – keyboards, programming
 Jeremy Wheatley – mixing
 Xenomania – production

Charts

Release history

References

External links
 

2007 songs
2007 debut singles
2000s ballads
Gabriella Cilmi songs
Island Records singles
Song recordings produced by Xenomania
Songs written by Brian Higgins (producer)
Songs written by Miranda Cooper
Songs written by Nick Coler
Songs written by Tim Powell (producer)
Songs written by Gabriella Cilmi